Christopher Nolan is a British-American film director, producer, and screenwriter. His feature directorial debut was the neo-noir crime thriller  Following (1998) which was made on a shoestring budget of $6,000. Two years later, he directed the psychological thriller Memento (2000) which starred Guy Pearce as a man suffering from anterograde amnesia (short-term memory loss) searching for his wife's killers. Similar to his debut feature it had a non-linear narrative structure, and was his breakthrough film. It was acclaimed by critics and was a surprise commercial success. For the film Nolan received his first nomination for the Directors Guild of America Award for Outstanding Directing – Feature Film, and for writing its screenplay he was nominated for the Academy Award for Best Original Screenplay. He next directed the mystery thriller remake Insomnia (2002) which starred Al Pacino, Robin Williams, and Hilary Swank. It was his first film for Warner Bros., and was a critical and commercial success.

In 2005, Nolan directed Warner Bros' superhero film Batman Begins which starred Christian Bale and told an origin story of the title character. The following year, he directed psychological thriller The Prestige (2006) in which Bale and Hugh Jackman played rival 19th-century stage magicians. His next film was the sequel to Batman Begins, The Dark Knight, in which Bale reprised his role as Batman opposite Heath Ledger as the Joker. The film grossed a worldwide total of over $1 billion, and was the highest grossing of 2008. It received eight nominations at the 81st Academy Awards, and Nolan received his second nomination at the Directors Guild of America Awards. In 2010, he directed the action film Inception starring Leonardo DiCaprio as a thief who leads a team who steal information by entering a person's subconscious. It was nominated for Best Film at the Academy Awards, British Academy Film Awards, and Golden Globe Awards, and Nolan received his third nomination at the Directors Guild of America Awards.

Two years later, he directed The Dark Knight Rises (2012), which grossed a worldwide total at the box office of over $1 billion. He followed this by producing Zack Snyder's superhero film Man of Steel (2013) and directing the science fiction film Interstellar (2014), which starred Matthew McConaughey, Anne Hathaway, and Jessica Chastain. It won the Saturn Award for Best Science Fiction Film. In 2017, Nolan directed the acclaimed war film Dunkirk, for which he received his first nomination for the Academy Award for Best Director. Three years later he directed the science fiction film Tenet (2020). His next feature will be Oppenheimer, a biopic centred on J. Robert Oppenheimer, with Cillian Murphy starring as the titular character. It is set to release in 2023.

Feature films 

Executive producer

Short films

Documentary appearances

Notes

See also 
 List of awards and nominations received by Christopher Nolan
 Cinematic style of Christopher Nolan

References

External links 
 

Director filmographies
Filmography
British filmographies
American filmographies